Gritė Maruškevičiūtė (born 18 June 1989, in Šiauliai) is Miss Lithuania 2010. She represented Lithuania in Miss World 2010 on October and she reached top 40 at beach beauty event.

Maruškevičiūtė currently living in capital city Vilnius and studying law and management in Mykolas Romeris University.

References 

Living people
1989 births
Lithuanian beauty pageant winners
Miss World 2010 delegates
People from Šiauliai
People from Vilnius
Mykolas Romeris University alumni